P@SHA/PASHA (Pakistan Software Houses Association for IT and ITeS) (1992–Present) is a functional trade body and registered association for the IT industry in Pakistan, primarily to promote and develop the software and services industry in Pakistan and to protect the rights of its members.

P@SHA is the sole non-profit organization that helps the IT industry in Pakistan be heard in the global arena. P@SHA is funded by its member companies, and organizes activities that promote the image and achievements of the industry. It works with the Government of Pakistan to develop IT friendly Environment in Pakistan. P@SHA won several Asia Pacific ICT awards and is a body which conducts ICT award in Pakistan.

Google, with the collaboration of P@SHA, created a social Innovation Fund to fund technological innovation in Pakistan.

Initiatives 
 Policy Advocacy
 ICT Awards
 NEST I/O
 ProWomen
 Events / CXO Meetups
 P@SHA Freelancer Community

See also
National Incubation Center (NIC)

References

Business organisations based in Pakistan
Organisations based in Karachi
Information technology in Pakistan
1992 establishments in Pakistan
Business and industry awards
Business incubators of Pakistan